The Assault is a 1998 American action film directed by Jim Wynorski.

The film is about a detective Stacy (Stacie Randall) who brings a witness for protection at a women's retreat. Villains after the witness descend on the building and the women and maintenance man Mike (Matt McCoy) have to defend themselves and fight them off. The plot was influenced by Assault on Precinct 13. Reviewer Douglas Pratt wrote that the "film is loaded with action scenes and supposedly helpless women wasting dozens of tough guys armed to the teeth, so what's not to like?."

Cast
Stacie Randall as Stacy
Matt McCoy as Mike
Melissa Brasselle as Toni
Sandahl Bergman as Helen
Leo Rossi as Zigowski

References

External links

1996 films
Films directed by Jim Wynorski
American action films
1990s English-language films
1990s American films